The Bregalnitsa–Strumica operation was an offensive operation of Bulgarian Army during World War II. It was held by Fourth Bulgarian army from October 15 to November 14, 1944, and was aimed to secure the left flank of the First Bulgarian Army, blocking the way for retreat of the German group armies 'E' from Greece. 

The onslaught of the Army began on October 15. After breaking the enemy resistance, its forces entered Kocani, and later seized the region of Štip. This allowed them to go in pursuit of German troops retreating to the valley of the river Vardar. On November 10, it took control over Veles and three days later assisted the First Bulgarian Army in the Stratsin-Kumanovo operation to take Skopje.

See also
Stratsin–Kumanovo operation
Kosovo operation 
Niš operation

Citations

Battles and operations of World War II
Military operations of World War II involving Germany
Yugoslavia in World War II
Battles involving the Yugoslav Partisans
Military operations of World War II involving Bulgaria
1944 in Yugoslavia
Conflicts in 1944